The following lists events that happened during 1837 in Chile.

Incumbents
President of Chile: José Joaquín Prieto

Events

June
3 June - Chilean Army officer Jose Antonio Vidaurre attempts to overthrow the Prieto government. The coup fails and Vidaurre is later executed.

November
17 November - The Treaty of Paucarpata is signed, temporarily ending the War of the Confederation.
17 November - The 1837 Valdivia earthquake is felt from Concepción to Chonos Archipelago.

Births
18 April - Eleuterio Ramírez (d. 1879)

Deaths
4 October - José Antonio Vidaurre (b. 1798)
19 July - Agustín Eyzaguirre (b. 1768)

References 

 
1830s in Chile
Chile
Chile